Choi Woo-jae (born 21 May 1990) is a South Korean footballer who plays as defender for Paju Citizen FC in K3 League.

Career
He was selected by Gangwon FC in 2013 K League Classic Draft.

References

External links 

1990 births
Living people
Association football defenders
South Korean footballers
Gangwon FC players
FC Anyang players
K League 1 players
K League 2 players
K3 League players
Chung-Ang University alumni
Place of birth missing (living people)